Ross Barney Architects is an architectural firm founded in 1981 by Carol Ross Barney in Chicago, Illinois.

History
Organized in February 1981 as Carol Ross Barney Architects, the firm served clients with cultural and social agendas but not necessarily high profile, big budgets. These clients were similar to ones founder, Carol Ross Barney, had worked with at Holabird and Root. In 1982, Jim Jankowski, FAIA, a college classmate of Carol's, joined the fledgling practice and the name changed to Ross Barney + Jankowski from 1984-2006.

The Cesar Chavez Multicultural Academic Center, completed in 1989, and Little Village Academy, completed in 1996, are early works of community conscious design. Today both schools have remained neighborhood sanctuaries virtually devoid of gang sponsored graffiti.

In 1997, the firm was chosen to design the Oklahoma City Federal Building. Following the attack on the Alfred P. Murrah Federal Building in 1995, the General Services Administration was tasked with developing standards for the protection of government buildings. The new building was both the philosophical and practical response to the tragedy. In 2005, Carol Ross Barney was awarded the Thomas Jefferson Award from the American Institute of Architects for her distinguished portfolio of public work.

In 2008, the Jewish Reconstructionist Congregation Synagogue in Evanston, Illinois, was the first house of worship to receive the highest LEED certification achievable by a building.

Throughout the studios history, a focus on transportation infrastructure has evolved, allowing them to look for sustainable solutions at an urban scale. The Morgan Street Station for the Chicago Transit Authority (CTA) is the first new inter system station constructed in more than thirty years. This acute understanding has led to designs for the Cermak McCormick Place CTA station and the multi-phase expansion of the Chicago Riverwalk.

Selected projects
 Chicago Riverwalk, In Progress, Chicago, Illinois
 Ohio State University South Campus Chiller Plant, Completed 2013, Columbus, Ohio
 Chicago Transit Authority CTA Morgan Street, Completed 2012, Chicago, Illinois
 University of Minnesota Duluth, James I Swenson Civil Engineering Building, Completed 2010, Duluth, Minnesota
 Jewish Reconstructionist Congregation, Completed 2008, Evanston, Illinois
 Oklahoma City Federal Building, Completed 2005, Oklahoma City, Oklahoma

Selected Awards
 World Architecture Festival, Category Commendation, Transport, CTA Morgan Street Station, 2013
 AIA/COTE Top Ten Green Projects, UMD James I Swenson Civil Engineering Building, 2013
 World Architecture Festival, Category Commendation, Community, Jewish Reconstructionist Congregation, 2009
 General Services Administration, Design Award, Oklahoma City Federal Building, 2006
 American Institute of Architects, Honor Award for Architecture, Little Village Academy, 2002
 American Institute of Architects, Honor Award for Interior Architecture, Little Village Academy, 1999
 American Institute of Architects, Honor Award for Architecture, Cesar Chavez Multicultural Center, 1994
 National Endowment for the Arts, Federal Design Achievement Award, 1992
 American Institute of Architects, Honor Award for Architecture, Glendale Heights Post Office, 1991

Exhibitions
 Jewish Museum New York and San Francisco, Reinventing Ritual: Contemporary Art and Design for Jewish Life, 2009
 Thresholds Along the Frontier: Contemporary U.S. Border Stations, 2006
 Chicago Architecture Foundation, 5 Architects, 2005
 National Building Museum, Future Design Now! The 2000 General Services Administration Design Awards, 2001
 Museum of Contemporary Art Chicago, Material Evidence, 2000
 Ispace, Gallery of the School of Fine and Applied Arts, University of Illinois at Urbana-Champaign, People + Places: The Work of Carol Ross Barney, 1999
 Art Institute of Chicago, Permanent Collection

Footnotes

Architecture firms based in Chicago
Design companies established in 1981
1981 establishments in Illinois